Maurice Manning (born 14 June 1943) is an Irish academic and former Fine Gael politician. Manning was a member of the Oireachtas (Irish Parliament) for 21 years, serving in both the Dáil and the Seanad. Since August 2002 he has been President of the Irish Human Rights Commission. On 12 March 2009 he was elected Chancellor of the National University of Ireland, while remaining President of the Human Rights Commission.

Early life
Manning was born in Muine Bheag, County Carlow, and educated at De La Salle schools there. He attended Rockwell College, University College Dublin (UCD) and the University of Strathclyde. He earned a BA and MA from UCD, which in 2000 awarded him a DLitt. An academic by background, Manning previously lectured in the politics department of UCD. He is a member of the Senate of the National University of Ireland and of the Governing Authority of UCD, and was a member of the Governing Authority of the European University Institute at Florence. He has written several books on modern Irish politics, including a biography of James Dillon, a political novel and a history of the Blueshirts movement.

Political career
Manning first stood for election in 1979 as a Fine Gael candidate for the Dublin constituency at the first European Parliament election, when he did not win a seat. He was unsuccessful again when he stood at the 1981 general election in the Dublin North-East constituency, but was then elected on the Cultural and Educational Panel to the 15th Seanad.

At the February 1982 Dáil election he stood again in Dublin North-East, winning a seat in the 23rd Dáil Éireann. He retained his seat at the November 1982 general election, but was defeated at the 1987 general election. He stood again in Dublin North-East at the 1989 general election, and in Dublin South at the 1992 general election but never returned to the Dáil.

After his 1987 defeat he was elected to the 18th Seanad, again on the Cultural and Educational Panel, and was re-elected three more times until he did not contest the 2002 election to the 22nd Seanad, when Fine Gael chose not to nominate him.  After the 2002 general election Manning had initially announced his intention to stand down, but when Enda Kenny was elected as party leader, he stayed on. However following the loss of 20 Dáil seats in 2002, the party's nominating committee chose to prioritise candidates who could challenge for Dáil seats at the next election, and he was not nominated. It was reported that this may have been related to a dispute with the Fine Gael Chairman, Senator Pádraic McCormack, whom Manning had threatened to challenge for the chairmanship.

In the early 1980s Manning was a member of the New Ireland Forum and later of the British–Irish Parliamentary Assembly. He served as Leader of the Seanad from 1995 to 1997 and as Leader of the Opposition in the Seanad from 1997 to 2002.

Human Rights Commission
As president of the Irish Human Rights Commission (IHRC), he has represented it since October 2006 in two successive two-year terms when the IHRC has chaired the European Group of National Human Rights Institutions. The IHRC has also represented the European Group within the Bureau of the International Coordinating Committee of National Human Rights Institutions (ICC), the global network of NHRIs closely associated with the Office of the United Nations High Commissioner for Human Rights. In 2012, with plans announced to merge the IHRC with the Equality Authority, it was expected that Manning would be appointed as the first head of the Irish Human Rights and Equality Commission; however, he did not receive that appointment.

References

1943 births
Academics of University College Dublin
Local councillors in Dublin (city)
Fine Gael TDs
Members of the 15th Seanad
Members of the 23rd Dáil
Members of the 24th Dáil
Members of the 18th Seanad
Members of the 19th Seanad
Members of the 20th Seanad
Members of the 21st Seanad
Politicians from County Carlow
People educated at Rockwell College
Alumni of University College Dublin
Alumni of the University of Strathclyde
Fine Gael senators
Chancellors of the National University of Ireland
Living people